Nikesh Shukla  (born 8 July 1980) is a British author and screenwriter. His writing focuses on race, racism, identity, and immigration. He is the editor of the 2016 collection of essays The Good Immigrant, which features contributions from Riz Ahmed, Musa Okwonga, Bim Adewunmi, and Reni Eddo-Lodge, among others. With Chimène Suleyman, he co-edited the 2019 follow-up collection called The Good Immigrant: 26 Writers Reflect On America.

Early life and career 
Shukla was born to Indian immigrants in the London suburb Harrow. He attended Merchant Taylors' school in Northwood, leaving in 1996.

Career

Literature 
Shukla is the author of three novels: Coconut Unlimited (2010), Meatspace (2014) and The One Who Wrote Destiny (2018). 

He is also the author of two books for Young Adults: Run, Riot (2018) and The Boxer (2019).

In 2017 he one of was one of the co-founders of the Jhalak Prize awarded annually to  British or British resident writers of colour. 

In 2019 he was made a Fellow of the Royal Society of Literature. He was a Rathbones Folio Prize Mentor in 2019–2020.

Brown Baby, a memoir addressed to his young daughter, was published in 2021. He hosts a podcast of the same name.

Film 
Shukla co-wrote the short film Two Dosas with Sarmad Masud. It starred Himesh Patel. After Danny Boyle awarded the film Best Short at the 2017 Shuffle Festival, Boyle cast Patel in the title role of Jack in Yesterday (2019).

Journalism 
Shukla has been a columnist for The Observers magazine supplement and The Pool.

Radio and podcasts 
In January 2019, Shukla appeared in series 47 of the BBC Radio 4 show Great Lives, nominating Pakistani wrestler The Great Gama (1878–1960).

Shukla hosted a podcast called The Subaltern podcast, in which he has conversations with writers about writing. He also co-hosted a podcast called Meat Up, Hulk Out with sci-fi writer James Smythe.

Selected works and publications

Books

Collections

Other work

Filmography 
 2014: Two Dosas (short film) - co-writer
 2011: Kabadasses (TV series)

Honours 
 2010: Costa Book Awards, first novel, short-list for Coconut Unlimited
 2010: Desmond Elliott Prize, long-list for Coconut Unlimited
 2014: Aspen Shortsfest's "Best Comedy" Short Film for Two Dosas
 2013: Sabotage Awards, Best Novella for The Time Machine
 2014: London Calling Plus "Jury Award" for Two Dosas
 2014: Shuffle Festival, Best Short for Two Dosas
 2016: Liberty Human Rights Award, shortlist 
 2016: Books Are My Bag Readers' Awards, reader's choice for The Good Immigrant
 2016: British Book Awards, Book of the Year short-list for The Good Immigrant
 2016: The Booksellers 100 most influential people in publishing
 2016: Foreign Policys 100 Global Thinkers  
 2019: Time magazine, one of the twelve leaders shaping the next generation of artists
 2019: CrimeFest Awards, Best YA for Run, Riot
 2019: National Book Awards, short-list for Run, Riot
 2019: Royal Society of Literature, Fellow
 2021: Declined offer of MBE for services to literature in the Queen's birthday honours list.

References

External links 
 
 

1980 births
Living people
Fellows of the Royal Society of Literature
People from Harrow, London
British male novelists
British people of Indian descent